"That's How You Know (When You're in Love)" is a song recorded by American country music artist Lari White, who co-wrote the song with her husband Chuck Cannon.   It was released in January 1995 as the third single from the album Wishes.  The song reached number 10 on the Billboard Hot Country Singles & Tracks chart. It features a harmony vocal from Hal Ketchum.

Critical reception
Billboard gave the single a positive review, saying that it was an "uplifting slice of country-pop".

Chart performance

References

1994 songs
Lari White songs
Songs written by Chuck Cannon
Song recordings produced by Garth Fundis
RCA Records singles
Music videos directed by Steven Goldmann
Songs written by Lari White
1995 singles